Kool-Aid is a brand of flavored drink mix owned by Kraft Foods

Kool-Aid or Cool Aid may also refer to:

Music
Coolaid, 2016 album by Snoop Dogg
Kool-Aid (album), the 1990 studio album from British musical group Big Audio Dynamite
"Cool Aid", song by Paul Humphrey and His Cool Aid Chemists
"Cool Aid", song by Phil Woods from Pairing Off
"Cool Aid", song by The Movement from Set It Off

Other uses
 Kool-Aid McKinstry, American football player
 Cool Aid: The National Carbon Test, Australian TV show by Network Ten
 Koolaids: The Art of War, a 1998 novel by Rabih Alameddine

See also
 Drinking the Kool-Aid, an American term for blind adherence to a bad idea